Luke Hauswirth (born October 11, 1995) is an American soccer player who plays as a defender.

References

External links
Profile at University of Washington Athletics

1995 births
Living people
American soccer players
Association football defenders
Detroit City FC players
FC Tucson players
National Premier Soccer League players
People from Woodbury, Minnesota
Soccer players from Minnesota
Sportspeople from the Minneapolis–Saint Paul metropolitan area
USL League One players
Washington Huskies men's soccer players
Union Omaha players